Curridabat is the eighteenth canton in the San José province of Costa Rica. The head city the homonymous Curridabat. The canton forms a suburb of the national capital of San José, lying on the southeast edge of the city.

History 
Curridabat was created on 21 August 1929 by decree 209.

In 1930 the canton had a municipality with three regidores, a Major (AKA Ejecutivo Municipal) and Jefe político (both charges were in the same person). At this time the canton's population were 5,000 people, but with the time and the population grew and the municipality had to create a sanitation department to collect garbage, road, sidewalk maintenance and built some infrastructure. Then the municipality Council was expanded to five members by popular election in 1970.

Geography 
Curridabat has an area of  km² and a mean elevation of  metres.

Points of interest
 Plaza del Sol (Sun's Plaza) a shopping center built between 1982 and 1983. At the time it was the most modern shopping center in the city. Today, it has many customers ranging from middle to high class.
 Multiplaza del Este (Eastern Multiplaza), now Multiplaza Curridabat is a mall built between August 2002 and October 2003 that belongs to the commercial chain with the same name and have other malls in Central America. It has food court, cinemas and stores. It is located in the old establishment of Republic Tobacco Co. The mall was expanded twice in 2007 and between 2013 and 2014.
 San José Indoor Club, it is a recreational sports club for the middle and high class in San José. It was opened during the mid-1970s.

Districts 
The canton of Curridabat is subdivided into the following districts:
 Curridabat
 Granadilla
 Sánchez
 Tirrases

Demographics 

For the 2011 census, Curridabat had a population of  inhabitants.

Notable residents
 Rafael Ángel Calderón Fournier, former president, lives in Pinares; also son of former president Rafael Ángel Calderón Guardia
 Karen Olsen Beck, wife of former president José Figueres Ferrer; also mother of former president José Figueres Olsen
 Alicia Bettoni, actress, voice actress, model, veterinary nurse and animal care specialist.

Transportation

Road transportation 
The canton is covered by the following road routes:

Rail transportation 
The Interurbano Line operated by Incofer goes through this canton.

References 

Cantons of San José Province
Populated places in San José Province